Peregrine (Alain Racine) is a fictional character appearing in American comic books published by Marvel Comics. Peregrine first appeared in Contest of Champions #1 and was created by Mark Gruenwald, Bill Mantlo, Steven Grant, John Romita Jr., and Pablo Marcos.

Name
The word "peregrine" does not mean "falcon" in French, making the name "Le Peregrine" quite odd to a French reader (the word does exist in French, though it is used to refer to the peregrine saltbush, or Atriplex suberecta and not any species of birds); in French translations of comics featuring the character, his name was changed to "Le Faucon Pèlerin", meaning "The Peregrine Falcon". Faucon-pérégrin does exist in French as an alternate name for the bird, but is now infrequently used. Adding "Le" in front of Peregrine does not make it French as Peregrine is not a French word. The proper use should either be "The Peregrine" or "Le Pèlerin".

Fictional character biography
Alain Racine was born in Moulins, France. He is a writer by profession, but is a superhero, adventurer, and mercenary, using a falcon-like costume with artificial wings giving him the ability to fly.

Peregrine was first seen in the Grandmaster's Contest of Champions against Death for the life of the Collector. He was chosen to compete on the Grandmaster's side, in the illustrious company of other heroes such as Captain America, Captain Britain, Wolverine, Daredevil, She-Hulk, and the Thing.  He was pitted against another winged opponent, the Angel, but the Angel's greater experience gave him the edge to defeat Le Peregrine.

Later, back on Earth, Peregrine encountered Silver Sable, who invited him to become her freelance operative in France. He assisted the archer Hawkeye in destroying a nuclear warhead generator stolen by the Red Skull, and freeing the Sandman—another of Silver Sable's operatives — in the process. He accepted an assignment from Silver Sable International to disable a surveillance station in the Persian Gulf. He maneuvered the American navy into destroying the station, and blew up a Stane International tanker. Later, Peregrine was compelled by Brain Drain's psionic powers to battle Sasquatch, but was defeated by Sasquatch.

During the superhero Civil War, Peregrine was protecting France's borders from refugee U.S. superhumans fleeing the Superhuman Registration Act. Likewise, he is seen protecting France alongside Micromax from Kang's armies during the Kang War.

During the Fear Itself storyline, Peregrine flies Black Widow into France when she is sent there on a mission by Captain Steve Rogers. When Black Widow uncovers civilians taken hostage by Rapido in a cathedral, she has Peregrine help free them while she deals with Rapido.

During the Secret Empire storyline, Peregrine appears as a member of the Champions of Europe alongside Ares, Captain Britain, Excalibur, Guillotine, and Outlaw. With help from Squirrel Girl and Enigma, the Champions of Europe manage to liberate Paris, France from Hydra forces.

Powers and abilities
Peregrine is an athletic man with a gifted intelligence but possesses no superhuman powers. He is a talented writer, and a master of savate (French kick-boxing).

Peregrine wears a suit of synthetic stretch fabric that incorporates an anti-gravity generator system which emits and controls anti-gravitons, enabling him to counteract gravitational attraction. He wears glider-wings that contain small hydrazine and nitrous oxide-fueled jet turbines that afford propulsion. Using all this equipment allows Peregrine to fly with a range of about  before exhausting his fuel supply. He wears goggles to protect his eyes while in flight, and carries radar detection devices.

While working as part of the Wild Pack, Silver Sable International supplied Peregrine with special weaponry including ammonium bromide gas grenades (to induce unconsciousness), napalm bolas, taser darts, thermite grenades, and an electromagnetic scrambler.

References

External links
 
 

Fictional mercenaries in comics
Fictional writers
Marvel Comics superheroes